Norrisia is a genus of  sea snail, a marine gastropod mollusk in the family Tegulidae.

Species
Norrisia is a monotypic genus and its only species is  Norrisia norrisii.

References

 
Tegulidae